Industrial Bank of Korea FC is a defunct South Korean semi-professional football club. The club was officially founded in 1969, by the Industrial Bank of Korea. The club played in the 1997 Korean FA Cup where they lost in the round of 16.

Honours

Domestic
 Korea Semi-Professional Football League :
Champions (11): 1975a, 1979s, 1985s, 1989s, 1990s, 1990a, 1991s, 1992a, 1994a, 1995a, 1997s
Runners-up (2): 1988s, 1994s
 Korean National Football Championship (Former FA Cup):
 Champions (2): 1991, 1993
 Korean President's Cup National Football Tournament :
 Champions (1): 1981
Runners-up (1): 1977

InvitationalDCM Trophy'''
Runners-up (1): 1987

Notable players
 Kim Jin-kook
 Jung Jae-Kwon

References

S
B
1969 establishments in South Korea
1997 disestablishments in South Korea
Financial services association football clubs in South Korea